Wunkar is a small town in the Murray Mallee region of South Australia. Wunkar was originally a station on the Moorook railway line. The town was surveyed in 1926 after the railway station name was approved in 1925. The railway closed in 1971. Wunkar now lies adjacent to the Stott Highway approximately 27 km west of Loxton. There are bulk grain silos at the former railway station. The school opened in 1925 and closed in 1973.

The southern boundary of the locality of Wunkar on Farr Road includes the former town and railway siding of Tuscan. No infrastructure remains there. In its day, Tuscan had a sawmill and a busy railway siding, but no school. Towards the northern edge of the locality is the site of the former siding of Parrelun railway station, renamed to Myrla in 1925. Myrla had a school opened in 1920. No evidence of it remains today.

References

Towns in South Australia